The Felons is a 1987 Yugoslavian drama film directed by Franci Slak. It was entered into the 38th Berlin International Film Festival.

Cast
 Mario Šelih as Peter Bordon
 Anja Rupel as Štefka
 Bata Živojinović as Preiskovalni
 Rade Šerbedžija as Raka
 Elizabeth Spender as Florence
 Boris Bakal as Uradnik Jovanovič
 Zijah Sokolović as Moše

References

External links

1987 films
1987 drama films
Slovene-language films
Films directed by Franci Slak
Slovenian drama films
Yugoslav drama films
Films set in Yugoslavia